Belgrano Department is a department of Argentina in Santiago del Estero Province. The capital city is Bandera.

References

Departments of Santiago del Estero Province